Mirza Abad (Urdu: مِرّزَاآبَّاد), also known as Mirzaabad, is a village in Union Council Daulatpur Pind Dadan Khan Tehsil, Jhelum District,Pakistan. It is Located at 32°41'12.71N' 73°20'48.99E with an altitude of 190 metres (420 feet), near the Salt Range and Khewra Salt Mine.

History 
The first house in the village was settled by Mirza Muhammad Yousaf, from Chakri village, in 1980. Because the first family to settle here was of Mirza caste, the name of the village became Mirza Abad.

Gallery

Mosques 
There are two mosques, Gulzar-e-Madina and Masjid-e-Bilal.

Education 
The village has a governmental primary school.

References 

Populated places in Jhelum District
Populated places in Pind Dadan Khan Tehsil